Zwanowice  (German: Schwanowitz) is a village in the administrative district of Gmina Skarbimierz, within Brzeg County, Opole Voivodeship, in south-western Poland.

Notable residents
 Udo von Woyrsch (1895–1983),  SS Obergruppenführer

References

Zwanowice